Christian Johnsen (born 10 June 1977) is a retired Norwegian football striker and current manager.

Joining Moss FK from Faaberg IL ahead of the 1998 season, he played two and a half seasons for them in Eliteserien and then three and a half seasons in Raufoss IL. After finishing second top goalscorer in the 2003 1. divisjon with 17 goals, he transferred to Örebro SK of Allsvenskan. After one season he had to retire following career-ruining injuries, and blamed ÖSK's artificial turf.

Johnsen enrolled at the Norwegian School of Sport Sciences. He also started a career in coaching, first for a Stabæk boys' team, later as player developer and assistant in Fram. At the time he resided in Sandefjord and worked at the Norwegian School of Elite Sport.

In 2017 he became head coach of Raufoss. He soon steered the team to promotion from the 2018 2. divisjon.

References

1980 births
Living people
Sportspeople from Lillehammer
Norwegian footballers
Moss FK players
Raufoss IL players
Örebro SK players
Eliteserien players
Norwegian First Division players
Allsvenskan players
Association football forwards
Norwegian expatriate footballers
Expatriate footballers in Sweden
Norwegian expatriate sportspeople in Sweden
Norwegian football managers
Raufoss IL managers